Events in chess during the year 2000:

Top players

FIDE top 10 players by Elo rating - July 2000;

Garry Kasparov  2849
Vladimir Kramnik  2770
Viswanathan Anand  2762
Alexander Morozevich  2756
Michael Adams  2755
Alexei Shirov  2746
Peter Leko  2743
Vassily Ivanchuk  2719
Veselin Topalov  2707
Michał Krasenkow  2702

Tournaments

Births
	
 Zhansaya Abdumalik, Kazakhstani chess player - 12 January
Alexey Sarana - 26 January
Max Warmerdam - 30 March
 Gunay Mammadzada - 19 June
Haik M. Martirosyan - 14 July
Temur Kuybokarov - 22 July
Parham Maghsoodloo - 11 August
Jeffery Xiong - 30 October
Carlos Daniel Albornoz Cabrera - 26 December
Samuel Sevian - 26 December

Deaths
Daniel Yanofsky, Canada's first chess Grandmaster - March 5
Aivars Gipslis, Latvian Grandmaster and chess writer - April 13
Arthur Dake, American chess master - April 28
Vladimir Bagirov, Grandmaster, chess author, and chess trainer - died of a heart attack while playing chess in Finland - July 21
George Koltanowski, record holder for most games won blindfolded simultaneously - September 17
Karl Robatsch, Australian chess player and botanist - September 19

References

 
20th century in chess
Chess by year